Kaiteriteri is a town and seaside resort in the Tasman Region of the South Island of New Zealand. It is close to both Mārahau, the main gateway to Abel Tasman National Park, and the town of Motueka.

Kaiteriteri  is a small coastal town reliant on tourism for much of its income, and there are many accommodation providers, cafés, pubs and restaurants. It is also a hub for the adventure tourism throughout the area and into Abel Tasman National Park. A number of walking and mountainbiking trails, including the Kaiteriteri Mountain Bike Park, begin from or pass through the town.

 
While it is most visited during the summer months, its temperate climate and low rainfall make it destination outside of peak season also. Nearby Breakers Bay is popular with nudists.

A number of water taxis, larger boats, and sea kayak companies depart from Kaiteriteri, taking visitors deeper into the national park.

Demographics

It had a population of 357 at the 2018 New Zealand census, an increase of 3 people (0.8%) since the 2013 census, and an increase of 48 people (15.5%) since the 2006 census. There were 123 households. There were 174 males and 180 females, giving a sex ratio of 0.97 males per female, with 36 people (10.1%) aged under 15 years, 48 (13.4%) aged 15 to 29, 171 (47.9%) aged 30 to 64, and 93 (26.1%) aged 65 or older.

Ethnicities were 96.6% European/Pākehā, 5.9% Māori, 0.8% Pacific peoples, 0.8% Asian, and 2.5% other ethnicities (totals add to more than 100% since people could identify with multiple ethnicities).

Although some people objected to giving their religion, 52.1% had no religion, 35.3% were Christian, 0.8% were Buddhist and 4.2% had other religions.

Of those at least 15 years old, 48 (15.0%) people had a bachelor or higher degree, and 42 (13.1%) people had no formal qualifications. The employment status of those at least 15 was that 120 (37.4%) people were employed full-time, 66 (20.6%) were part-time, and 12 (3.7%) were unemployed.

Kaiteriteri is part of the Kaiteriteri-Riwaka SA2 statistical area.

References

External links

 Kaiteriteri on the New Zealand Tourism Guide
 District council's information page
 Kaiteriteri Photo Gallery

Populated places in the Tasman District
Populated places around Tasman Bay / Te Tai-o-Aorere